

Australia

Head coach: Eddie Thomson

Colombia

Head coach: Hernán Darío Gómez

Denmark

Head coach: Viggo Jensen

Egypt

Head coach: Mahmoud Saad El-Din Ahmed

Ghana

Head coach: Sam Arday

Italy

Head coach: Cesare Maldini

South Korea

Head coach:  Kim Sam-rak

Kuwait

Head coach:  Valmir Louruz

Mexico

Head coach:  Óscar Iparraguirre

Morocco

Head coach:  Werner Olk

Paraguay

Head coach:  Sergio Markarián

Poland

Head coach: Janusz Wójcik

Qatar

Head coach:  Evaristo de Macedo

Spain

Head coach: Vicente Miera

Sweden

Head coach: Nisse Andersson

United States

Head coach: Lothar Osiander

References

 FIFA
 RSSSF

Squads
1992 Summer Olympics